Shumsk is a city in Kremenets Raion, Ternopil Oblast, Ukraine. It hosts the administration of Shumsk urban hromada, one of the hromadas of Ukraine. Population is 

Until 18 July 2020, Shumsk was the administrative center of Shumsk Raion. The raion was abolished in July 2020 as part of the administrative reform of Ukraine, which reduced the number of raions of Ternopil Oblast to three. The area of Shumsk Raion was merged into Kremenets Raion.

Gallery

People from Shumsk
 Konstantin Igelström (1799–1851), Russian noble and Decembrist
 Jan Savitt (1907–1948), American bandleader.

People associated with Shumsk
 Michał Kazimierz "Rybeńko" Radziwiłł (1702–1762), Polish-Lithuanian noble, owner of Shumsk.

References

 
Cities in Ternopil Oblast
Towns of district significance in Ukraine